George Winter (1815 – 14 September 1879) was a pastoralist  and politician in colonial Victoria, a member of the Victorian Legislative Council.

Early life
Winter was born in Oakley Park, King's county, Ireland, the son of Samuel Pratt Winter and Frances Rosa, née Bamford.

Colonial Australia
Winter arrived in the Port Phillip District in August 1837. On 2 June 1853 Winter was elected to the unicameral Victorian Legislative Council for Villiers and Heytesbury. Winter held this position until resigning in August 1854.

Winter died in Levuka, Fiji on 14 September 1879; he had earlier married Elizabeth Cox.

References

 

1815 births
1879 deaths
Members of the Victorian Legislative Council
Australian pastoralists
Irish emigrants to colonial Australia
Politicians from County Offaly
19th-century Australian politicians
19th-century Australian businesspeople